Live at the Roxy (or Roxy Live) is an album by Eric Burdon recorded in May 1975. It features songs from the "Mirage project". It was released in 1998.

Track listing
 "First Sight" (5:33)
 "Dragon Lady" (9:59)
 "House of the Rising Sun" (9:45)
 "Don't Let Me Be Misunderstood" (8:14)
 "Freedom" (3:07)
 "Jim Crow" (6:13)
 "River of Blood" (9:54)

 The album was recorded in Los Angeles and re-released in 2008 entitled "Live in Hollywood". This album included one more song from this gig called "Ghetto Child", which was released before on the 1997 compilation Soldier of Fortune.

References

Eric Burdon albums
1998 live albums